Asplenium sagittatum is a species of fern in the family Asplenium (spleenworts).

Sources

References

sagittatum
Flora of Malta